This is a list of all managers of Dunfermline Athletic Football Club.

Managerial history
Information correct as of match played 13 August 2022. Only official Scottish League, Scottish Cup, Scottish League Cup, Scottish Challenge Cup and European Competition matches are counted

Key

Key to record:
P = Matches played
W = Matches won
D = Matches drawn
L = Matches lost
Win % = Win ratio

References

 
Dunfermline Athletic
Managers
Managers